Sunshine Express may refer to:

 Sunshine Express (train) in Queensland
 Sunshine Express Airlines